Merkwiller-Pechelbronn is a commune in the Bas-Rhin department in Grand Est in north-eastern France.

It is notable as the original home of oil sands mining.

Oil sands were mined from 1745 in Merkwiller-Pechelbronn, initially under the direction of Louis Pierre Ancillon de la Sablonnière, by special appointment of Louis XV. The Pechelbronn oil field was active until 1970, and was the birthplace of companies such as Antar and Schlumberger. The first modern oil sands refinery was built there in 1857; and it also had the first school of oil technology.

See also
 Communes of the Bas-Rhin department

References

External links

 Official site (in French)

Communes of Bas-Rhin
Bituminous sands